Love Songs is a compilation album by American singer-songwriter Luther Vandross. It was released by Sony Music Entertainment unit  J Records on January 29, 2009.

Track listing
UK version

"Never Too Much" – 3:50
"Give Me the Reason" – 4:45
"Your Secret Love" – 4:01
"Dance with My Father" – 4:25
"Take You Out" – 3:26
"Got You Home" – 3:38
"Power of Love/Love Power" – 4:21
"So Amazing" – 3:41
"Buy Me a Rose" – 3:48
"Love the One You're With" – 3:45
"Any Love" – 5:02
"Always and Forever" – 4:53
"Endless Love" (Duet with Mariah Carey) – 4:18
"Love Is on the Way (Real Love)" – 4:43
"Heaven Knows" – 5:00
"Here and Now" – 5:22
"A House Is Not a Home" – 7:08
"See Me" – 5:29
"The Best Things in Life Are Free" (Duet with Janet Jackson) – 4:36

Charts

Certifications

References

2009 compilation albums
Luther Vandross compilation albums
Compilation albums published posthumously